Arnold Herbert Buss (August 7, 1924 – June 26, 2021) was a professor emeritus of psychology at the University of Texas at Austin known for his work in aggression, temperament, self-consciousness and shyness.

Career
Buss received his B.A. from New York University in 1947 after serving as a medic in the United States Army during World War II and received his Ph.D. from Indiana University in 1952. He worked as a lecturer at the University of Iowa from 1951 to 1952 and then served as the Chief Psychologist at Larue D. Carter Memorial Hospital from 1952 to 1957. He was a professor at the University of Pittsburgh from 1957 to 1965 and a professor at Rutgers University from 1965 to 1969. He joined the faculty of the University of Texas at Austin in 1969 as a full professor and would retire in 2008.

Works

Books

References

1924 births
2021 deaths
20th-century American psychologists
University of Texas at Austin faculty
Indiana University alumni
New York University alumni
University of Pittsburgh faculty
Rutgers University faculty
Personality psychologists
People from Brooklyn
21st-century American psychologists